John Bernard (1756 in Portsmouth, England – 29 November 1828 in London) was an English actor and biographer. He was the author of Retrospections of the Stage (1830) and Retrospections of America, 1797-1811. He acted in a number of plays with Mary Ann Duff.  His son, William Bayle Bernard, was a playwright and critic, and edited editions of his Retrospections.

References

External links
Retrospections of the Stage Volume 1 (Google Books)
Retrospections of the Stage Vol. 2 (Internet Archive)
Retrospections of America, 1797-1811 (Google Books)

English biographers
English male stage actors
18th-century English male actors
19th-century English male actors
1756 births
1828 deaths
19th-century English writers
English male non-fiction writers
19th-century English male writers